Grant Township is a civil township of Huron County in the U.S. state of Michigan.  As of the 2000 census, the township population was 833.

History
Grant Township was established in 1867.

Geography

Demographics
As of the census of 2000, there were 833 people, 307 households, and 237 families residing in the township.  The population density was 23.5 per square mile (9.1/km2).  There were 334 housing units at an average density of 9.4 per square mile (3.6/km2).  The racial makeup of the township was 96.04% White, 1.32% African American, 0.12% Native American, 0.24% Asian, 0.24% from other races, and 2.04% from two or more races. Hispanic or Latino of any race were 1.32% of the population.

There were 307 households, out of which 35.5% had children under the age of 18 living with them, 65.1% were married couples living together, 6.5% had a female householder with no husband present, and 22.8% were non-families. 19.5% of all households were made up of individuals, and 8.1% had someone living alone who was 65 years of age or older.  The average household size was 2.69 and the average family size was 3.06.

In the township the population was spread out, with 29.1% under the age of 18, 6.5% from 18 to 24, 27.9% from 25 to 44, 24.6% from 45 to 64, and 12.0% who were 65 years of age or older.  The median age was 35 years. For every 100 females, there were 115.2 males.  For every 100 females age 18 and over, there were 109.6 males.

The median income for a household in the township was $40,536, and the median income for a family was $43,750. Males had a median income of $31,450 versus $21,528 for females. The per capita income for the township was $17,615.  About 5.5% of families and 10.3% of the population were below the poverty line, including 11.8% of those under age 18 and 11.4% of those age 65 or over.

References

Notes

Sources

Townships in Huron County, Michigan
1867 establishments in Michigan
Townships in Michigan